Andy Fitch (born August 28, 1936) is an American wrestler. He won an NCAA championship for Yale University in 1959, a gold medal at the 1963 Pan American Games, and competed in the men's Greco-Roman bantamweight at the 1964 Summer Olympics.

References

External links
 

1936 births
Living people
American male sport wrestlers
Olympic wrestlers of the United States
Wrestlers at the 1964 Summer Olympics
Sportspeople from New York City
Pan American Games medalists in wrestling
Pan American Games gold medalists for the United States
Wrestlers at the 1963 Pan American Games
Medalists at the 1963 Pan American Games
20th-century American people